Frankie Mann may refer to:
 Frankie Mann (composer)
 Frankie Mann (actress)
 Frankie Mann (jockey)

See also
 Frank Mann (disambiguation)